The 2000 Wokingham District Council election took place on 4 May 2000 to elect members of Wokingham Unitary Council in Berkshire, England. One third of the council was up for election and the Conservative Party lost overall control of the council to no overall control.

After the election, the composition of the council was:
Conservative 27
Liberal Democrat 27

Election result

Ward results

References

2000 English local elections
2000
2000s in Berkshire